The Roman Catholic Diocese of Gikongoro is a diocese located in the city of Gikongoro in the Ecclesiastical province of Kigali in Rwanda. The diocese is home to the parish of Kibeho, where there were reported apparitions of the Virgin Mary throughout the 1980s. A shrine celebrating the apparitions of Our Lady of Kibeho now stands at the site and serves as a place of pilgrimage. The diocese also includes large Catholic parishes at Kaduha and Cyanika. Gikongoro was historically the poorest province in Rwanda. Gikongoro is now part of South Province.

The first bishop to serve the diocese, Augustin Misago, was appointed in part because he had studied and written on the Kibeho apparitions when he served as Rector of the Grand Seminary of Nyakibanda. In 1999, the Rwandan government charged Bishop Misago with complicity in the 1994 genocide, and he spent 14 months in prison while his trial took place. He was ultimately acquitted in June 2000 and allowed to return to his functions as bishop.

History
 March 30, 1992: Established as Diocese of Gikongoro from the Diocese of Butare

Leadership
 Bishops of Gikongoro (Roman rite)
 Augustin Misago (1992-2012)
 Célestin Hakizimana (2015–present)

See also
Roman Catholicism in Rwanda

References

External links
 GCatholic.org 
 Catholic Hierarchy 

Roman Catholic dioceses in Rwanda
Christian organizations established in 1992
Roman Catholic dioceses and prelatures established in the 20th century